Nevins Township is one of twelve townships in Vigo County, Indiana, United States. As of the 2010 census, its population was 1,975 and it contained 881 housing units.

Geography

Unincorporated communities
 Coal Bluff
 Cobb
 Ehrmandale
 Fontanet

Adjacent townships
 Raccoon Township, Parke County (northeast)
 Dick Johnson Township, Clay County (east)
 Posey Township, Clay County (southeast)
 Lost Creek Township (southwest)
 Otter Creek Township (west)
 Florida Township, Parke County (northwest)

Cemeteries
The township contains these four cemeteries: Cress, Harpold, Richer and Sullian.

Lakes
 Morey Lake
 Spring Lake

School districts
 Vigo County School Corporation

Political districts
 Indiana's 8th congressional district
 State House District 44
 State Senate District 38

References
 United States Census Bureau 2007 TIGER/Line Shapefiles
 United States Board on Geographic Names (GNIS)
 IndianaMap

External links

Townships in Vigo County, Indiana
Terre Haute metropolitan area
Townships in Indiana